The Game of Funk is the only studio album by American R&B quartet Sons of Funk, released on April 21, 1998 on No Limit and was entirely produced by Beats By the Pound. The album features label mates Master P, Silkk the Shocker & Mo B. Dick. The album didn't make it very high on the charts compared to other No Limit releases at the time, but it still managed to make it to #44 on the Billboard 200 and number 14 on the Top R&B/Hip-Hop Albums. The single "Pushin' Inside You" made it to  number 97 on the Billboard Hot 100.

Track listing
"Make Love to a Thug"- 4:18 (featuring Master P)
"Sons Reasons"- 3:17
"You and Me"- 3:52
"I Got the Hook Up (song)"- 4:17 (featuring Master P)
"Y'all I Want"- 4:06
"The First Time"- 4:39
"Side to Side"- 4:00 (featuring Master P, Silkk the Shocker & Mo B. Dick)
"Makin' Luv to My Bitch"- 3:33 (featuring KLC, Mo B. Dick)
"Pushin' Inside You"- 3:49
"Sons...I Got the Hook-Up! (R&B)"- 4:07
"Don't Wanna Let You Go"- 4:20
"Hey Lady"- 3:55
"Time Will Tell"- 4:09 (featuring Master P)

Charts

Release history 

1998 debut albums
No Limit Records albums
Priority Records albums